José Carbó is an Argentinian-Australian opera baritone. He has performed nationally and internationally for Opera Australia, the Sydney Symphony Orchestra and the Metropolitan Opera.

Carbó worked with Slava and Leonard Grigoryan to produce an album titled My Latin Heart. It was nominated for the 2012 ARIA Award for Best Classical Album. The trio then embarked on a tour also titled My Latin Heart featuring music from the album.

Along with classical guitarists Andrew Blanch and Ariel Nurhadi he formed the José Carbó Trio who first performed in 2015.

Discography

Albums

Awards and nominations
In 2004, Carbó won the Australian Singing Competition's Opera Award. He received a Helpmann Award for Best Male Performer in a Supporting Role in an Opera for Opera Australia's Die tote Stadt in 2013.

ARIA Music Awards
The ARIA Music Awards is an annual awards ceremony that recognises excellence, innovation, and achievement across all genres of Australian music. They commenced in 1987. 

! 
|-
| 2012
| My Latin Heart (with Slava and Leonard Grigoryan)
| Best Classical Album
| 
|rowspan="2" | 
|-

References

External links
 

Year of birth missing (living people)
Living people
Australian operatic baritones
Helpmann Award winners
Argentine expatriates in Australia